Wharncliffe Side is a village in South Yorkshire, England, northwest of Sheffield and within the city borough.

The village has a population of 1355 as of 2011, and is a commuter village for Sheffield and Stocksbridge. The village is within the Stocksbridge and Upper Don electoral ward. There is a primary school on Brighthomelee Lane, along with a post office and two public houses within the village. Glen Howe Park is situated at the southern end of the village.

See also
Wharncliffe Crags, river Don valley landmark north of the village, associated with the legend of the Dragon of Wantley

References

External links
 http://www.wharncliffeside.org.uk/ - Wharncliffe Side Primary School Website

Villages of the metropolitan borough of Sheffield
Towns and villages of the Peak District